HDMS Niels Juel (F354) was a  in the Royal Danish Navy which was in use until 1990. The ship was named after Niels Juel, a 16th-century Danish admiral.

Design

The corvettes were fitted with an Otobreda 76 mm main gun, two quad RGM-84C Harpoon surface-to-surface missile (SSM) launchers, a MK 48 Mod 3 VLS Sea Sparrow surface-to-air missile (SAM) launcher carrying 12 missiles, two FIM-92A Stinger SAM launchers, two 20 mm Oerlikon anti-aircraft guns, seven 12.7 mm M/01 LvSa machine guns, and a Mark 3 depth charge launcher.

Niels Juels radar suite consisted of two Terma Scanter Mil 009 units for navigation, an EADS TRS-3D air search unit, and a CelsiusTech 9GR 600 surface search unit. Fire control was provided by a CelsiusTech 9 LV 200 gun radar, and a General Dynamics Mk 95 missile radar. She was fitted with a Plessey PMS-26 hull-mounted sonar. The corvette was fitted with a Rascall Cutlass B-1 intercept unit, a Telgon HFD/F unit, and four 6-round Seagnat Mk 36 chaff launchers.

Construction and career
She was laid down on 20 October 1977 and launched on 17 February 1978 by Aalborg Værft, Aalborg. The vessel was commissioned on 26 August 1989.

Niels Juel was decommissioned in 2009 and was scrapped by Lindø shipyard in February 2013.

Gallery

See also

References

External links

Niels Juel-class corvettes
Ships built in Aalborg
1978 ships
Corvettes of the Cold War